A number of ships of the French Navy have borne the name Invincible; among them:

Ships of the French Navy named Invincible 
  (1666), a 64-gun ship of the line 
  (1674), a galley 
  (1680), a galley 
  (1688), a galley built in 1683, better known as Réale, bore the name between 1688 and 1691.
  (1691), a galley  
  (1691), a 70-gun ship of the line 
  (1747), 74-gun ship of the line 
  (1780), 110-gun ship of the line 
  (1861), Gloire-class warship

See also 
 List of French privateers named for Napoleon Bonaparte

Citations and references

Citations

References
 
 

French Navy ship names